The 1981 Paris Open was a men's Grand Prix tennis tournament played on indoor hard courts. It was the 12th edition of the Paris Open (later known as the Paris Masters). It took place at the Palais omnisports de Paris-Bercy in Paris, France from 26 October through 1 November 1981.

Finals

Singles

 Mark Vines defeated  Pascal Portes 6–2, 6–4, 6–3
 It was Vines's only singles title of his career.

Doubles

 Ilie Năstase /  Yannick Noah defeated  Andrew Jarrett /  Jonathan Smith 6–4, 6–4
 It was Nastase's 2nd title of the year and the 100th of his career. It was Noah's 4th title of the year and the 9th of his career.

References

External links 
 ATP tournament profile
 ITF tournament edition details